The idiom "jumping the shark" is pejorative and is used to argue that a creative work or outlet appears to be making a stunt in a seemingly exhaustive attempt to generate elevated attention or publicity to something that was once perceived as popular, but is no longer. The phrase was coined in 1985 by Jon Hein in response to a 1977 episode from the fifth season of the American sitcom Happy Days, in which Fonzie (Henry Winkler) jumps over a shark while on water-skis.

History

Origin 

Jon Hein and his University of Michigan roommate Sean Connolly coined the phrase in 1985 in response to season 5, episode 3, "Hollywood: Part 3" of the sitcom Happy Days,  which aired on September 20, 1977. In the episode, the central characters visit Los Angeles, where a water-skiing Fonzie (Henry Winkler) answers a challenge to his bravery by wearing swim trunks and his trademark leather jacket, and jumping over a confined shark. The stunt was created as a way to showcase Winkler's real-life waterskiing skills.

In 1997, Hein created a website, JumpTheShark.com, to publish a list of approximately 200 television shows, and his arguments as to the moments each "jumped the shark". The site became popular, and grew with additional user-contributed examples. Hein sold his company, Jump The Shark, Inc., for "over $1 million" in 2006.

Response from Happy Days cast and crew

Ron Howard 

In 2006, during his contribution to The Interviews: An Oral History of Television, Ron Howard (Richie) talked about the Happy Days episode that inspired the phrase:"I remember Donny Most and I sitting there, looking at the script. Donny was really upset. He said, 'Oh man look at what our show has kind of devolved into. It's not even very funny, and you know Fonz is jumping over a shark'... and I kept saying 'Hey Donny we're a hit show, relax. You know it's hard to have great episodes one after another. Fonzie jumping over a shark it's gonna be funny, and great... I remember thinking that creatively this was not our greatest episode, but I thought it was a pretty good stunt, and I understood why they wanted to do it. And what I remember the most is, it was fun actually driving the speedboat which I did a bit of, noticing that Henry was really a pretty good water skier... But the thing that has to be remembered about the jumping the shark idea, is that the show went on to be such a massive success for years after that.  So,  it's kind of a fun expression, and I get a kick out of the fact that they identified that episode (because granted maybe it was pushing things a little too far), but I think a lot of good work was still done after that show, and audiences seemed to really respond to it."

Fred Fox, Jr 

In a 2010 Los Angeles Times article, former Happy Days writer Fred Fox, Jr., who wrote the episode that later spawned the phrase, said "Was the [shark jump] episode of Happy Days deserving of its fate? No, it wasn't. All successful shows eventually start to decline, but this was not Happy Days time." Fox also points not only to the success of that episode ("a huge hit" with over 30 million viewers), but also to the continued popularity of the series. In addition, that same season would later include the episode, "My Favorite Orkan", launching the career of the then-unknown actor, Robin Williams. He was consequently given his own spin-off, Mork & Mindy.

Henry Winkler 

In a 2019 interview with NPR, Henry Winkler (Fonzie) told Terry Gross that the origin of the stunt began with the fact that he had been a water-skiing instructor as a teenager at a summer camp. Thus, his father used to say to him "every day for years—tell Garry Marshall that you water ski. Dad, I don't think I'm going to do that. No, no. Tell him you water ski. It's very important. I finally tell Garry, my father wants you to know I water ski." Winkler did all of the water skiing for the scene himself, except for the actual jump. Gross then asked Winkler what it was "about that scene or that episode that came to signify when something's time is up—when it's over?" Winkler responded: "You know what? I don't know. To them, the Fonz water skiing was just like the last straw. The only thing is it wasn't to the audience because we were No. 1 for years after that. So it didn't much matter to anybody." In addition, he told TheWrap in 2018 that he is "not embarrassed" by the phrase. He stated that "newspapers would mention jumping the shark... and they would show a picture of me in my leather jacket and swim shorts water-skiing. And at that time I had great legs. So I thought, 'I don't care.' And we were No. 1 for the next four or five years." As his character Barry Zuckerkorn (in the sitcom Arrested Development) hopped over a shark in Episode 13 of the second season, Winkler also noted that there "was a book, there was a board game and it is an expression that is still used today... [and] I'm very proud that I am the only actor, maybe in the world, that has jumped the shark twice—once on Happy Days, and once on Arrested Development."

Broader usage 

The idiom has been used to describe a wide variety of situations, such as the state of advertising in the digital video recorder era, and views on rural education policy, the anomalous pursuit of a company acquisition, and the decline of republics into degraded democracy and empire.

Examples 

Automotive journalist Dan Neil used the expression to describe the Mini Countryman, a much larger evolution of the previously small cars marketed by Mini. In March 2011, in a review titled "What Part of 'Mini' Did You Not Grasp, BMW?" Neil said the bigger car abandoned the company's design ethos and that "with the Countryman, tiny sharks have been jumped".

Similar to the example above, automotive blog The Truth About Cars used the expression in a 2010 retrospective piece to describe the Cadillac Cimarron, a rebadged Chevrolet Cavalier the Cadillac luxury car division sold in the 1980s that ended up being a commercial failure that did major damage to the brand's image; "Yes, as if there was ever any doubt, GM truly jumped the shark with the Cimarron, and it led the way for what was GM's most disastrous decade ever, the eighties. Only GM could have such utterly outsized hubris to think it could get away with dressing up a Cavalier and pawning it off as a BMW-fighter, without even touching the engine, among other sins."

In September 2011, after Republican presidential candidate for the United States Michele Bachmann repeated an anecdote shared with her claiming that the HPV vaccine causes "intellectual disability", radio commentator Rush Limbaugh said "Michele Bachmann, she might have blown it today. Well, not blown it—she might have jumped the shark today."

In August 2014, the city manager of Black Rock City, Nevada described Burning Man, an annual event at nearby Black Rock Desert, as having "jumped the shark", when the 2014 event—which had been previously noted for core values of radical self-expression and self-reliance—featured incongruously posh VIP lounges, cell phone towers, private jets, and "glamping".
The implication that Burning Man has "jumped the shark" (or is a fallen utopia) is questioned by cultural anthropologist Graham St John, who argues that Burning Man was never a utopia in the first place.

In January 2018, journalist Keith Olbermann criticized the inclusion of esports players on the sports journalism website The Players' Tribune, saying that they "have jumped the shark by publishing pieces by snotty random kids playing children's games" in response to an article by Doublelift, a League of Legends player.

In May 2021, CNBC news anchor Carl Quintanilla proposed that Elon Musk had jumped the shark with his advocacy of cryptocurrencies instead of focusing on Tesla, Inc as it began to lose market share and its stock price began to plunge.

Writing in the April 2–3, 2022, edition of the Wall Street Journal, reporter Kathryn O'Shea-Evans quoted an interior designer who remarked that chef's kitchens in homes were  passé.  "Chef's kitchens have jumped the shark. And for what?  Unpacking takeout?"

In February 2023, when newspapers dropped the comic strip Dilbert following cartoonist Scott Adams' racist comments, Mike Peterson, columnist for the industry blog The Daily Cartoonist, said “The strip jumped the shark.” Peterson argued that Adams had “kind of ran out of office jokes and started integrating all this other stuff so after a while, it became hard to distinguish between Scott Adams and 'Dilbert.'"

Related idioms

Nuke the fridge 

In 2008, TIME identified a term modeled after "jump the shark": "nuke the fridge". Specifically applicable to film, the magazine defined the term: "to exhaust a Hollywood franchise with disappointing sequels."

The phrase derives from a scene in the fourth Indiana Jones film, Indiana Jones and the Kingdom of the Crystal Skull, in which Indiana Jones survives an atomic bomb detonation by fitting himself into a lead-lined refrigerator to shield himself from the radiation. The explosion annihilates its surroundings but sends the refrigerator flying sufficiently distant for the protagonist to escape unhurt. The scene was criticized as being scientifically implausible.

Within two days of the film's premiere, the phrase "nuke the fridge" had gone viral, describing film scenes that similarly stretched credulity. Director Steven Spielberg later said the scene was "my silly idea" and was glad to have been part of the pop-culture phrase, while the film's executive producer George Lucas took similar credit believing that Jones would have had an even chance of surviving the blast.

Growing the beard 

"Growing the beard" refers to the opposite of jumping the shark; i.e. when a show dramatically improves in quality. In the series Star Trek: The Next Generation the second season is considered to be better in terms of storytelling over the first season. This shift coincided with character William Riker, who was clean-shaven for the first season, growing a mustache and beard that he retained for the second season.

Notes

References

Further reading

External links 

 Henry Winkler Reflects on "Jumping the Shark" on 'Happy Days'- Sirius XM, October 19, 2020.
 Jon Hein Tracks When TV Shows "Jump the Shark" and Picks the Best Series Ever—The Howard Stern Show, September 11, 2019.

Happy Days
Television terminology
Popular culture neologisms
Metaphors referring to fish
1985 neologisms